Holly Lee, born 1953 in Hong Kong, is an artist-photographer, best known for her portraits project, the Hollian Thesaurus. She was one of the pioneers of conceptual photography in Hong Kong, experimenting with Photoshop to create composite photographs that were reminiscent of oil paintings. Her work has been collected by the Hong Kong Heritage Museum and M+ Museum.

Holly Lee has worked as a professional photographer since 1980. She was one of the founders of Dislocation, a monthly photography journal in Hong Kong active from 1992 to 1998. In 1997, she re-located from Hong Kong to Toronto, Canada where she and Lee Ka Sing, an artist-photographer, set up INDEXG (a gallery and art studio space). The duo now publishes online on a weekly periodical, Double Double by Ocean Pounds.

Career 
In her first photography series, Pictures of My Friends, Artists and Others, Holly Lee photographed many artists and creatives in Hong Kong including Antonio Mak and Ann Hui. She was inspired by the portraits by Richard Avedon, which she described as "naked and intense". This series of black-and-white portraits featured the subject in the foreground against a white background.

Holly Lee is best known for her works in the Hollian Thesaurus project. The project consists of twelve portraits created between 1994 and 2000, contemplating and exploring a period of change in Hong Kong leading up to the handover of Hong Kong. Lee explores themes of East and West cultural dialogues and identities, often juxtaposing historical and contemporary elements.

Using digital manipulation, Lee combined photographs, sourced imagery and 19th-century export painting from Guangdong to create the Hollian Thesaurus portraits. The portraits are reminiscent of Renaissance oil paintings—Lee added fine lines to mimic the cracks in old oil paintings, creating an air of nostalgia. Her most recognised portrait, The Great Pageant Show, presents a Miss Hong Kong beauty pageant winner in the style of Queen Elizabeth II presented in front of a Qing court painting.

Works in the Hollian Thesaurus include:

 Madodhisattva, 1993
 Jinx, in Front of Hong Kong Harbor, circa 1994
 The White-Haired Girl, Pre-97 Version, 1995
 The Great Pageant Show, circa 1997
 Bauhinia, 1997
 Barbie The Great, Beauty Monopolizer, 2000

List of selected works 

 Hollian Thesaurus, 1994–2000
 Dun Huang Series, 1991
 Footsteps of June Series, 1989
 Pictures of My Friends, Artists and Others, 1981–1986

Awards 

 Asian Cultural Council Fellowship, 1994
 Award for Best in Multimedia—Pan Pacific Digital Artistry Competition, 1996
 Kodak Grand Award, Gold Award in Digital Imaging (Hong Kong Institute of Professional Photographers, 1993; 1995)

Selected exhibitions 
Solo Exhibitions

 Si-ling and Owltoise series, Photo Centre Gallery, Hong Kong, 1985
 Footsteps of June, La Cadre Gallery, 1989

Group Exhibitions

 What's Next 30x30, Shenzhen and Hong Kong, 2011
 YYZ Dialogue, Seven Toronto Artist in Response to the Poems of Leung Ping Kwan, Toronto, 2011
 Art+01: A Digital Exploration, Hong Kong Heritage Museum, Hong Kong, 2001
 Identities: Art in HKSAR Government Offices Abroad, Hong Kong Convention & Exhibition Centre, Hong Kong, 2000
 On Hong Kong—An Exhibition of Contemporary Photography, City Hall, Hong Kong, 1998
 New Voices—Contemporary Art from Hong Kong, Taipei, and Shanghai, Pao Galleries, Hong Kong Arts Centre, Zhung Zheng Gallery, National Taiwan Arts Education Institute, 1998
 Asia Cultural Council Group exhibition, Cultural Center of the Philippines, Philipiines, 1997
 Hong Kong Arts Festival, Berlin, Germany, 1997
 Hong Kong Portfolio, organised by the Asia Society at the Hong Kong Convention Centre and Fringe Gallery, Hong Kong, 1997
 Hong Kong‚ Four Perspectives, Chinese Cultural Centre, Vancouver, 1997
 Renga, a global art collaboration on the Internet, organised by Japan Telecom, 1997
 group Show on Alternative Photography, Shen Yang Luzun Art Academy, China, 1997
 New Images from Hong Kong, Tower Gallery, Yokohama, Japan, 1996
 2+3+4 Dimension Digital Art Exhibition, Hong Kong Arts Centre, 1996
 Contemporary Photography from Mainland China, Hong Kong and Taiwan, Hong Kong Arts Centre, Hong Kong, 1994
 Asian Photography, Malaysia, 1986

References 

Hong Kong women artists
Conceptual photographers
Multimedia artists
Women multimedia artists
1953 births
Living people
Hong Kong artists